The 2011 World Rally Championship was the 39th season of the FIA World Rally Championship in automobile racing. The season consisted of 13 rallies, beginning with Rally Sweden on 10 February and ended with Wales Rally GB on 13 November.

Sébastien Loeb claimed his eighth consecutive World Championship title at the Wales Rally of Great Britain when title rival Mikko Hirvonen retired on the first day with an engine that was too damaged to restart.

Changes

 The new technical regulations for the World Rally Car became effective from 2011. The cars were based on the previous Super 2000 cars, fitted with a supplementary kit, which included turbo and rear-wing additions. The kit must be able to be fitted or removed within a defined time limit, to be determined. They will be powered by a 1600cc turbo engine instead of the previous 2000cc turbo unit.
 The sporting regulations were amended to allow any tyre manufacturer to supply tyres. Regulations were implemented to control costs. The amended regulations were presented to the WMSC for a fax vote before 20 July 2010.
 Michelin and British tyre firm DMACK became the two tyre suppliers for the season, following Pirelli's contract coming to an end and their announcement as the official tyre supplier for Formula One.
 Additional championship points will be awarded to the top three crews on a televised stage on the final day of each rally, known as the "Power Stage". 3 points will be awarded to the stage winner, with 2 and 1 for second and third respectively.

Calendar

The 2011 championship was contested over thirteen rounds in Europe, the Middle East, North America, South America and Oceania.

Following a fax vote by the members of the World Motor Sport Council (WMSC), the following calendar had been agreed for the 2011 FIA World Rally Championship.

Calendar changes
Rally di Sardegna and Rally Argentina returned to the WRC after one year in the Intercontinental Rally Challenge, replacing Rally Bulgaria and Rally Japan.
Acropolis Rally replaced Rally of Turkey after a sabbatical year.
Rally Australia replaced Rally New Zealand and relocated for the second time in five years. After moving from Perth in Western Australia to Kingscliff on the east coast after the 2006 event, the event ran out of Coffs Harbour,  to the south. The city has regularly hosted a round of the Australian Rally Championship for over a decade.

Teams and drivers

Driver changes

 After being promoted to the Citroën works team for the 2010 Rally Finland in place of Dani Sordo, Sébastien Ogier signed a contract to drive for the team for the entire 2011 season, despite an offer from Ford.
 2009 Intercontinental Rally Challenge champion Kris Meeke will move to the World Rally Championship, joining debutants Mini in their Prodrive-run John Cooper Works WRC. He will be joined by Dani Sordo after the Spaniard lost his place at Citroën.
 Peter van Merksteijn Jr. will compete for Van Merksteijn Motorsport with a Citroën DS3 WRC in 10 selected events, while his father Peter van Merksteijn Sr. will drive in 3.
 Daniel Oliveira who previously competed in the Intercontinental Rally Challenge will compete with a MINI John Cooper Works WRC in selected events for the Brazil World Rally Team.
 Dennis Kuipers, who raced in 2010 with a Ford Fiesta S2000 run by M-Sport, will compete for the FERM Power Tools World Rally Team.

Team changes
 Mini returned to the World Rally Championship as a factory team for the first time since 1967. The John Cooper Works WRC will be run in a limited campaign of selected events for the 2011 season, with a view to taking part in the full World Championship from 2012.

SWRC entries

PWRC entries

WRC Academy entries
The WRC Academy used identical Ford Fiesta R2s.

Results and standings

Results and statistics

Standings

Drivers' championship
Points are awarded to the top 10 classified finishers.

 Sébastien Loeb secured the drivers' championship title in Wales.

Notes:
 1 2 3 refers to the classification of the drivers on the 'Power Stage', where bonus points are awarded 3–2–1 for the fastest three drivers on the stage.

Co-drivers' championship

Manufacturers' championship

 Citroën secured the manufacturers' championship in Catalunya.
 † – ICE 1 Racing was excluded from the manufacturers' championship after they failed to take part in Rally Australia. As the team is considered to be a WRC entry (as opposed to a development entry, like the Mini WRC Team), it was obligated to take part in at least two rounds of the championship outside Europe. Driver Kimi Räikkönen had previously taken part in Rally Jordan, but had not competed in any further events outside Europe, and Rally Australia was the final flyaway round of the championship.

SWRC Drivers' championship

 † Frigyes Turán Excluded from Championship

PWRC Drivers' championship

 † Excluded from Championship

WRC Academy Drivers' championship

 Note: 1 refers to the number of stages won, where a bonus point is awarded per stage win.
 † Deducted 25 points

References

External links

Official website of the World Rally Championship
 FIA World Rally Championship 2011 at ewrc-results.com

 
World Rally Championship
World Rally Championship seasons